The Sawtooth Wilderness is a federally-protected wilderness area that covers  of the state of Idaho. Managed by the U.S. Forest Service in the U.S. Department of Agriculture, it was designated the Sawtooth Primitive Area in 1937 to preserve the exceptional scenic beauty of the Sawtooth Mountains. On August 22, 1972 Public Law 92-400 designated the Primitive Area as the Sawtooth Wilderness and part of the newly created Sawtooth National Recreation Area. As part of the National Wilderness Preservation System, the Sawtooth Wilderness is an area where human development and use are restricted and people are to remain only visitors. According to the United States Environmental Protection Agency, the Sawtooth Wilderness has some of the clearest air in the lower 48 states.

History

Sawtooth National Forest was created as the Sawtooth Forest Reserve in the U.S. Department of Agriculture by proclamation of President Theodore Roosevelt on May 29, 1905. It was named after the Sawtooth Mountains in the northwestern part of the forest. On October 12, 1937, the U.S. Forest Service established the Sawtooth Primitive Area in the Sawtooth Mountains. Subsequently, Sawtooth National Forest began to extensively develop recreation opportunities, including new campgrounds, trails, and roads.

In 1960, Frank Church, a U.S. Senator from Idaho, first introduced legislation for a feasibility study to study the area for national park status. While Church allowed the 1960 feasibility study legislation to die, he introduced a bill in 1963 to create Sawtooth Wilderness National Park, which would primarily encompass the existing Sawtooth Primitive Area. While the 1963 bill also died, Church admitted that it wasn't designed to pass but rather to encourage thorough feasibility studies by both the Forest Service and National Park Service. Support for greater protection of the Sawtooths and surrounding areas grew after the discovery of a molybdenum deposit at the base of Castle Peak in the White Cloud Mountains in 1968.

In March 1971 Idaho's congressional delegation was finally united and introduced legislation to create the SNRA. On August 22, 1972 Public Law 92-400 establishing the SNRA, covering , and banning mining in it passed both the House of Representatives and Senate and was signed into law by President Richard Nixon. As part of this legislation, the Sawtooth Primitive Area became the Sawtooth Wilderness covering  and part of the National Wilderness Preservation System under the Wilderness Act of 1964. The SNRA was dedicated in a ceremony held on the shores of Redfish Lake on September 1, 1972.

Management

The Sawtooth Wilderness is managed by Sawtooth National Recreation Area, which is a division of Sawtooth National Forest.

The Wilderness Act of 1964 enhanced the protection status of remote or undeveloped land already contained within federally administered protected areas. Passage of the act ensured that no human improvements would take place aside from those already existing. The protected status in wilderness-designated zones prohibits road and building construction, oil and mineral exploration or extraction, and logging, and also prohibits the use of motorized equipment, including bicycles. The only manner in which people can enter wilderness areas is either on foot or horseback. Hunting and fishing are permitted in the wilderness, just as they are throughout the SNRA, provided those engaging in such activities have the proper licenses and permits. Fires and stock are prohibited in certain high-use areas of the wilderness.

Recreation

Wilderness areas do not allow motorized or mechanical equipment, including bicycles. Although camping and fishing are allowed with proper permit, no roads or buildings are constructed, and there is also no logging or mining. Hunting is permitted during the appropriate hunting seasons. Hunting and fishing licenses are available from the state of Idaho through the Idaho Department of Fish and Game. Most of these trails were constructed or reconstructed in the 1960s. Mountain climbing, rock climbing, snowshoeing, and backcountry downhill skiing are activities that are also permitted in the wilderness. The closest town to the wilderness is Stanley at the northern end of the Sawtooth Valley, but the communities of Atlanta and Sawtooth City also provide access to the wilderness.

Geography and geology

Mountains
The Sawtooth Wilderness encompasses the Sawtooth Mountains, which are part of the Rocky Mountains. The second highest point in Mount Cramer. The northern Sawtooth Mountains formed from the Eocene Sawtooth batholith, while south of Alturas Lake the Sawtooth Mountains formed from the Cretaceous granodiorite of the Idaho Batholith.

Waterways

The entire wilderness is in the watershed of the Snake River, a tributary of the Columbia River, which flows into the Pacific Ocean. The western side of the wilderness is in the watershed of the South Fork of the Payette River, while part of the southern end of the wilderness is drained by the Boise River. Several hundred lakes exist in the Sawtooth Wilderness, and nearly all are the result of glaciation. The largest lake in the wilderness is Sawtooth Lake, and other large lakes include Alice, Toxaway, Ardeth, Edna, Hell Roaring, Goat, and Baron lakes. Lakes in the wilderness can remain frozen until mid-summer, and many of the smaller lakes are unnamed.

Seismology
It is believed to be capable of producing an earthquake measuring up to 7.5 on the Richter magnitude scale, with one of the most recent large earthquakes occurring 4,000 years ago and a second 7,000 years ago.

Glaciology 
The Sawtooth Wilderness has a history of alpine glaciation, and while no surface glaciers exist today, perennial snow fields and rock glaciers remain, usually on north or east facing slopes. There have been 202 perennial snow fields mapped in the Sawtooth Mountains.  The Sawtooth Mountains were last extensively glaciated in the Pleistocene, but glaciers probably existed during the Little Ice Age, which ended around AD 1850. Remnants of glacial activity include glacial lakes, moraines, horns, hanging valleys, cirques, and arêtes.

Natural Resources

Flora

Land cover types in the Sawtooth Wilderness include pine and spruce-fir forests, meadows, and alpine tundra. Lodgepole pine forms nearly monotypic forests in lower elevations of the wilderness, while douglas fir and quaking aspen can also be found. Higher elevations contain whitebark pine, Engelmann spruce, subalpine fir, and limber pine. There are no known threatened or endangered plant species in the wilderness.

Fauna

Most of the area's native mammal species are present in the wilderness, with the exception of grizzly bears, which have become locally extinct. Gray wolves were reintroduced to the SNRA amidst controversy in the mid-1990s and now occupy most of the forest except for the Minidoka District. They were reintroduced to restore the ecosystem stability that they provide as top predators, including managing high elk populations, which had inhibited new vegetation growth. Opponents to the reintroduction included hunters concerned that wolves would inhibit their ability to hunt the highest number of game species possible, ranchers concerned for the welfare of their animals, and land developers concerned that a species listed under the Endangered Species Act may restrict what they can do to their land. Plans for the reintroduction of grizzly bears to central Idaho have been proposed since the 1990s, but have not progressed because of concerns similar to those with the wolf reintroduction but also concerns for personal safety. The wilderness contains habitat for wolverines and the endangered Canada lynx, but no recent sightings of these species have been reported.

Other large mammals found in the wilderness include mule deer, elk, moose, mountain goats, mountain lions, and black bears. Bull trout are the management indicator species for Sawtooth National Forest, and they can be found in some of the streams in the wilderness. Population monitoring efforts are undertaken every year to provide an assessment of forest health.  They were selected because they are dependent upon specific habitat conditions and sensitive to habitat changes.

See also

 List of peaks of the Sawtooth Range (Idaho)
 List of mountains of Idaho
 List of mountain peaks of Idaho
 List of mountain ranges in Idaho

References

External links

Inventory of all lakes in the Sawtooth Wilderness

 
Boise National Forest
Protected areas established in 1972
Protected areas of Blaine County, Idaho
Protected areas of Boise County, Idaho
Protected areas of Custer County, Idaho
Protected areas of Elmore County, Idaho
Salmon-Challis National Forest
Sawtooth National Forest
Wilderness areas of Idaho